The Women's time trial at the 1996 UCI Road World Championships took place in Lugano, Switzerland on 9 October 1996. 33 riders participated in the race.

Final classification (top 20)

Source

References

Women's Time Trial
UCI Road World Championships – Women's time trial
UCI